Oluwafemi "Femi" Ibrahim Seriki (born 28 April 2003) is an English professional footballer who plays as a wing-back for Rochdale on loan from Sheffield United.

Club career
Seriki is a product of Bury's academy and had a couple of appearances on their bench before Bury left the English football league in 2019. He transferred to Sheffield United on 26 September 2019. He made his professional debut with Sheffield United as a late sub in a 1–0 Premier League loss to Newcastle United on 19 May 2021. Two days later he signed his first professional contract.

On 12 August 2021, Seriki joined Sheffield United's sister club Beerschot on a season-long loan deal. In November 2021, it was revealed that Seriki had been recalled from his loan spell.

On 22 March 2022, Seriki joined National League North side Boston United on a youth loan for the remainder of the 2021–22 season.

On 15 July 2022, Seriki joined Rochdale on a season-long loan.

Personal life
Born in England, Seriki is of Nigerian descent. He has one sister called Seun.

Career statistics

References

External links
 

2002 births
Living people
Footballers from Manchester
English footballers
English people of Nigerian descent
Sheffield United F.C. players
Bury F.C. players
Boston United F.C. players
Premier League players
English Football League players
National League (English football) players
Association football wingers
Association football fullbacks
English expatriate footballers
English expatriate sportspeople in Belgium
Expatriate footballers in Belgium
K Beerschot VA players
Belgian Pro League players